Revealia is a genus of Mexican plants in the tribe Eupatorieae within the family Asteraceae. The only known species is Revealia macrocephala, native to the Mexican State of Guerrero.

The genus is named for US botanist James L. Reveal.

References

Eupatorieae
Flora of Guerrero
Monotypic Asteraceae genera